Pokrovka is a rural locality (a village) in Tavtimanovsky Selsoviet, Iglinsky District, Bashkortostan, Russia. The population was 143 as of 2010. There are 2 streets.

Geography 
Pokrovka is located 23 km northeast of Iglino (the district's administrative centre) by road. Spasskoye is the nearest rural locality.

References 

Rural localities in Iglinsky District